Van Vorst Park is a neighborhood in the Historic Downtown of Jersey City, Hudson County, New Jersey, centered on a park sharing the same name. The neighborhood is located west of Paulus Hook and Marin Boulevard, north of Grand Street, east of the Turnpike Extension, and south of The Village and Christopher Columbus Drive. Much of it is included in the Van Vorst Park Historical District.

The park was a centerpiece of Van Vorst Township, a township that existed in Hudson County from 1841 to 1851. Van Vorst was incorporated as a township by an Act of the New Jersey Legislature on April 12, 1841, from portions of Bergen Township. On March 18, 1851, Van Vorst Township was annexed by Jersey City.

The name Van Vorst comes from a prominent family in the area, the first of which arrived in the 1630s as superintendent of the patroonship Pavonia, the earliest European settlement on the west bank of the Hudson River in the province of New Netherland. His homestead at Harsimus, plus others at Communipaw, Paulus Hook, Minakwa, Pamrapo were later incorporated into Bergen. His namesake and eighth generation descendant, Cornelius Van Vorst, was the twelfth Mayor of Jersey City serving from 1860 to 1862.

Like Harsimus Cove and Hamilton Park to the north and Bergen-Lafayette to the southwest, the neighborhood contains nineteenth century rowhouses and brownstones. It is home to the Jersey City Medical Center, James J. Ferris High School (named for the Jersey City citizen who laid the foundation of the Hudson and Manhattan Railroad Powerhouse with his firm Stillman, Delehanty and Ferris),  and Old Colony Shopping Plaza. Landmarks include Barrow Mansion and Dixon Mills.

The Grove Street PATH station is located nearby to the north and is the Jersey Avenue (HBLR station) to the south.

Park 

Van Vorst Park is a two-acre city park bounded by Barrow Street on the east, Montgomery Street on the north, Jersey Avenue on the west and York Street on the south. The park was renovated in 1999 at a cost of two million dollars with money raised by the Friends of Van Vorst Park.

See also
 List of neighborhoods in Jersey City, New Jersey
 List of Registered Historic Places in Hudson County, New Jersey
 Pavonia, New Netherland
 Odonyms in Hudson County, New Jersey
 Grace Church Van Vorst

Images

References

External links

Neighborhood Association Website
Van Vorst Park Map
Grove Street Shoppers Guide and Neighborhood Map
Walking tour of Van Vorst
Friends of Van Vorst Park
Not Yo Mama's Craft Fair
Van Vorst Park (2005 Film)
Jersey City Main Library

Neighborhoods in Jersey City, New Jersey
Historic districts in Hudson County, New Jersey
Houses on the National Register of Historic Places in New Jersey
National Register of Historic Places in Hudson County, New Jersey
Parks in Hudson County, New Jersey
Houses in Hudson County, New Jersey
New Jersey Register of Historic Places
Squares in Jersey City, New Jersey
Parks on the National Register of Historic Places in New Jersey